BAA2 or Baa2 may refer to:

 Backing Australia's Ability, public policy
 Moody's Investors Service's credit rating